The 2018 Primera B de Chile, known as the 2018 Campeonato Loto for sponsorship purposes, was the 65th season of Chile's second-tier football league. The competition began on 2 February 2018 and ended on 1 December 2018. Coquimbo Unido were the champions.

Format

The tournament was played by 16 teams which played each other twice (once at home and once away), for a total of 30 matches. The team that finished in first place at the end of the round-robin tournament earned promotion to the Campeonato Nacional for the 2019 season. Meanwhile, the teams finishing from second to sixth place played in a playoff tournament for the second promotion berth, with the season runners-up having a bye to the final. The team finishing in bottom place at the end of the season was relegated to the Segunda División Profesional.

Teams

Stadia and locations

Standings

Results

Promotion playoff

Quarterfinals

Santiago Wanderers won 6–1 on aggregate.

Cobresal won 4–3 on aggregate.

Semifinals

Cobresal won 4–3 on aggregate.

Finals

Cobresal won 4–3 on aggregate and earned promotion to the Primera División.

Top goalscorers

Source: Soccerway

See also
 2018 Chilean Primera División

References

External links
Primera B on ANFP's website

Primera B de Chile seasons
Primera B
Chile